Rudy is a masculine given name, sometimes a short form (hypocorism) of Rudolph. 

Rudy may also refer to:

People
 Rudolph Valentino
 Rudolf Nureyev

Places

Poland

 Rudy, Silesian Voivodeship, a village
 Rudy Landscape Park, Silesian Voivodeship
 Rudy, Lublin Voivodeship, a village
 Rudy, Krotoszyn County, Greater Poland Voivodeship, a village
 Rudy, Słupca County, Greater Poland Voivodeship, a village

Elsewhere

 Rudy, Iran, a village
 Rudy, Arkansas, United States, a town
 Rural Municipality of Rudy No. 284, Saskatchewan, Canada

Arts and entertainment
 Rudy (film), a 1993 sports drama
 Rudy: The Rudy Giuliani Story, a 2003 biopic
 Rudy, a comic strip by William Overgard
 Rudy, a tank in the Polish TV series Czterej pancerni i pies
 "Rudy" (Cher song), by Cher from I Paralyze, 1982
 "Rudy", a song from the album Crime of the Century by Supertramp
 "Rudy, A Message to You" a 1980s pop song
 Rudy, an albino Baryonyx in Ice Age 3: Dawn of the Dinosaurs

Other uses
 Rude boy, also known as rudie, rudi or rudy, a subculture originating in Jamaica
 R-U-Dead-Yet? (RUDY), a technique in internet denial-of-service attacks

See also
 Rudi (disambiguation)
 Rudolph (disambiguation)